Statlanta is the debut studio album by Atlanta rapper Stat Quo. First recorded and set to be released in 2003, under Shady Records, Aftermath Entertainment and Interscope Records with mentors Eminem and Dr. Dre as executive producers, it was reworked in seven years not featuring any of the original material recordings, and was released on July 13, 2010 under Sha Money XL's Dream Big Ventures label after many push-backs.

Statlanta debuted at #85 on Billboard's Top R&B/Hip-Hop Albums chart.

Production and guests
Statlanta features production from Sha Money XL, Needlz, S1, Boi-1da, Stat Quo himself, among others. Featured guests include Marsha Ambrosius, Antonio McLendon, Brevi, Esthero, Raheem DeVaughn, Devin the Dude, and Talib Kweli. Former mentor Dr. Dre was involved since the recording process, and served as production consultant-supervisor, he helped Stat Quo along with Aftermath producer Mike Chav to materialize the album.

Two leftover tracks featuring Eminem, titled "Atlanta On Fire" (also known as "The Next One") and "Classic Shit" (also known as "Testify") have been leaked to the internet.

Singles
The first single from the album was "Ghetto USA" featuring Antonio McLendon, who is also Stat Quo's songwriting labelmate on Aftermath Entertainment, which was released on December 8, 2009 via Amazon.com. A Video was released for the single on November 13, 2010.

The second and final single from the album was "Success", which was released on May 18, 2010 via Amazon.com. A video was released for the single on March 2, 2010.

Track listing

Charts

References

2010 debut albums
Stat Quo albums
Albums produced by Boi-1da
Albums produced by Needlz
Albums produced by Symbolyc One